Filiz Kocaman (born February 23, 1985 in Tokat) is a Turkish volleyball player. She is 178 cm and plays as libero. She plays for Fenerbahçe Women's Volleyball Team since 2007 season start and wear 14 number. She played 43 times for national team. She also played for Eczacıbaşı, Şişli, Yalovaspor and Konya Selçuk University.

See also
 Turkish women in sports

External links
 Player profile at fenerbahce.org

1985 births
Living people
Sportspeople from Tokat
Turkish women's volleyball players
Fenerbahçe volleyballers
Eczacıbaşı volleyball players